The Ludwig Biermann Award is an annual prize awarded by the German  (German Astronomical Society) to an outstanding young astronomer. The prize is named in honour of the German astronomer Ludwig Biermann and was first awarded in 1989, three years after his death. Nominees for the award must be under the age of 35. The monetary value of the award is 2500 €, and it is intended to enable the awardee to make one or more research visits to an institute of their choice. Usually, only a single prize is awarded per year, but in a few cases, two 
prizes have been awarded.

Past winners of the Ludwig Biermann Award

See also 
 List of astronomy awards
 Prizes named after people

References

Astronomy prizes
German science and technology awards
Awards established in 1989